Konevo is a rural locality (a khutor) in Nizhnemedveditsky Selsoviet Rural Settlement, Kursky District, Kursk Oblast, Russia. Population:

Geography 
The khutor is located 97 km from the Russia–Ukraine border, 12 km north-west of Kursk, 2 km from the selsoviet center – Verkhnyaya Medveditsa.

 Climate
Konevo has a warm-summer humid continental climate (Dfb in the Köppen climate classification).

Transport 
Konevo is located 2 km from the federal route  Crimea Highway (a part of the European route ), 6 km from the road of intermunicipal significance  (Kursk – Iskra), 1.5 km from the road  (38N-379 – Chaplygina – Alyabevo), 10.5 km from the nearest railway halt Bukreyevka (railway line Oryol – Kursk).

The rural locality is situated 15 km from Kursk Vostochny Airport, 137 km from Belgorod International Airport and 214 km from Voronezh Peter the Great Airport.

References

Notes

Sources

Rural localities in Kursky District, Kursk Oblast